Eddy Yawe Sentamu is a Ugandan musician, vocalist for Afrigo Band and also a politician. Sentamu is also the founder of Dream Studios, a music production studiobased in Kamokya Kampala which was founded in 2003 .

Early life and education 
Sentamu was born and raised in Kinoni Gomba District to Mr. Setantamu Gerald a fourth born of 34 children. Sentamu started his education from Kinoni Primary School for his primary education and then joined St. Henry's College Kitovu for his secondary education. He after went to Netherlands where he had his University education from and later attained his master's degree in radio and television. Sentamu also studied sound engineering from Morgan State University and University of Baltimore in the United States after getting a scholarship and after an internship from Hollywood.

Career 
Sentamu started singing when he joined Kinoni church choir in 1997 after his secondary education. Sentamu and two others formed a music band called Dimension 2000, through which they connected to different artists. Sentamu released his first album, Pamela, while he was in Netherlands for studies. After moving to the US, he started Dream Studio, which he transferred to Uganda after moving back.

Political career 
In 2006 Ugandan general elections, Sentamu supported the Democratic Party and campaigned for Erias Lukwago, who contested for Kampala Central Division Member of Parliament (MP) and is  the lord mayor of Kampala.

In 2011, Sentamu himself contested for the Kampala Central Division MP on a Democratic Party card, but lost to Muhammad Nsereko, who was running on an National Resistance Movement card.

In 2016, Sentamu ran for MP of the Kira Municipality, where he lost to Semuju Nganda, who was running on Forum for Democratic Change card.

Discography 
Sentamu's songs include:

Controversy 
In April 2011, Sentamu appeared before Buganda Road Court in Kampala after being charged with inciting violence, unlawful assembly and malicious damage to property to which cases he denied and was granted bail.

Personal life 
Sentamu is a brother to a presidential candidate and musician Kyagulanyi Sentamu Robert, better known as Bobi Wine.

References 

1980 births
Living people
Ugandan musicians
Ugandan businesspeople
People from Gomba District